Jason Quang-Vinh Pendant (born 9 February 1997) is a French professional footballer who plays as a defender for  club Quevilly-Rouen.

Club career

Sochaux
Born in Sarcelles, France, Pendant began his youth career with hometown club Sarcelles AAS before joining Sochaux. After playing in seven matches for the first team during the 2016–17 Ligue 2 season; Pendant signed his first professional contract with the club on 20 June 2017. He scored his first professional goal on 23 January 2018 in a 2–1 victory against Colomiers in the Coupe de France.

New York Red Bulls
On 10 March 2020, Pendant completed a transfer to MLS club, New York Red Bulls. On 11 July 2020, Pendant made his debut for New York in a 1–0 victory over Atlanta United. After featuring regularly for New York during the 2020 season, Pendant appeared mostly with New York Red Bulls II, making nine USL Championship appearances in 2021.

Quevilly-Rouen
On 12 July 2022, Pendant was transferred to Ligue 2 side Quevilly-Rouen for an undisclosed fee.

International career
Pendant was born in France to a French Guianan father and a Vietnamese mother, making him eligible for both national teams. He was a youth international player for France. In 2019, he expressed an interest in representing the Vietnam national team after the VFF reached out to him about the possibility of playing for them in the future.

Career statistics

Notes

See also
 List of Vietnam footballers born outside Vietnam

References

External links
FFF Profile

1997 births
Living people
People from Sarcelles
Association football defenders
French footballers
France youth international footballers
Ligue 2 players
FC Sochaux-Montbéliard players
New York Red Bulls players
New York Red Bulls II players
US Quevilly-Rouen Métropole players
French people of Vietnamese descent
Black French sportspeople
Major League Soccer players
USL Championship players
Footballers from Val-d'Oise